Prime Time Soap is a 2011 Brazilian drama film produced by João Queiroz and directed by Odilon Rocha. The feature is produced by Querosene Filmes, Cria Filmes, Geração Conteúdo and TC Filmes, co-produced and distributed by Universal Pictures. It stars Cláudia Ohana, Vanessa Giácomo, Mateus Solano, André Ramiro between other actors.

Is a tribute to the Brazilian drama, against the backdrop of the novel Dancin' Days, Gilberto Braga, who influenced the imagination of most of the Brazilians in terms of fashion, behavior and thinking. The director Odilon Rocha, told the press that "the film recreates the look of the club that appeared on TV, which is in the imagination of most Brazilians who lived through that time and also the youth who knows through novel scenes that can be seen on the internet. The intention is to take viewers to that colorful universe ".

The film debuted to the public at the Festival do Rio in 2011 for later, according to the plans of the director, be presented in international festivals and be released commercially in Brazil, by Universal films, on 30 March 2012.

Plot
Brazil, 1978, a group of people live their lives under the dictatorship, the euphoria of disco fever and the fantasy of "Dancin' Days", a prime time soap, which fictional drama is set on the homonymous night club in Rio de Janeiro. After a fatal incident, Amanda and Dora (a high-class prostitute addicted to the TV drama, and her "maid") are forced to run away from São Paulo to Rio de Janeiro with the fed Brandão in hot pursuit. While the excitement of visiting the disco "Dancin' Days" distracts Amanda from the danger of the situation she is in, Dora gets ready to confront her secret past. In a six degrees of separation manner, their destine will cross with João Paulo, a diplomat who feels like a foreigner in his own country, the revolutionary Vicente and his brother Pedro, and the teenager Caio, who was raised by his grandparents and counts with the support of his friend Mônica as he struggles to be accepted as a gay man. Both youngster are crazy about disco fever and fascinated by the soap "Dancin' Days".

Cast
 Cláudia Ohana as Dora Dias
 Vanessa Giácomo as Amanda Lima
 Mateus Solano as João Paulo
 André Ramiro as Sergio
 Paulo Lontra as Caio
 Thaís Müller as Mônica
 Aline Fanju as Flávia
 Camilla Amado as Maria
 Otto Jr. as Vicente
 Guilherme Duarte as Pedro

References

External links
 

2011 films
Brazilian drama films
2010s Portuguese-language films
Brazilian LGBT-related films
LGBT-related drama films
2011 drama films
Universal Pictures films
2011 LGBT-related films